Pedlinge is a hamlet on the edge of the village of Saltwood in Kent, England. It has its own church, though this is officially classified as a District Chapel-of-Ease since Pedlinge is part of the parish of Saltwood, and not a parish in its own right.

The heart of the community is a collection of buildings comprising the church, a house, and two cottages. Nearby is the rear-entrance gatehouse to Sandling Park, though as of 2007, the gatehouse dwelling was derelict. The main house, Sandling Park, was also derelict for some time, but was rebuilt by the owner of the Sandling Estate, Alan Hardy. In 2007, the house was occupied by Carolyn Hardy.

The community is dominated by Sandling Park, a large house and estate named after Saltwood's other hamlet, Sandling. The chapel at Pedlinge is traditionally the place of worship of the estate workers. It was commissioned by Laurence Hardy. The estate stretches from Sandling to Pedlinge.

Gallery

Notes 

Hamlets in Kent